Odeleite is a freguesia (parish) in the municipality of Castro Marim (Algarve, Portugal). The population in 2011 was 763, in an area of 142.24 km².

References

Freguesias of Castro Marim